Yves Kamanzi (born 19 May 1999) is a South African cricketer. He made his first-class debut for KwaZulu-Natal in the 2018–19 CSA 3-Day Provincial Cup on 17 January 2019. He made his List A debut for KwaZulu-Natal in the 2018–19 CSA Provincial One-Day Challenge on 20 January 2019. He made his Twenty20 debut on 26 September 2021, for Western Province in the 2021–22 CSA Provincial T20 Knock-Out tournament.

References

External links
 

1999 births
Living people
South African cricketers
KwaZulu-Natal cricketers
Western Province cricketers
Place of birth missing (living people)